Blepephaeus nepalensis is a species of beetle in the family Cerambycidae. It was described by Masao Hayashi in 1981. It is known from Nepal.

References

Blepephaeus
Beetles described in 1981